Church of the Exaltation of the Holy Cross may refer to:

 Church of the Exaltation of the Holy Cross, Tambov, Russia
 Church of the Exaltation of the Holy Cross, Kazan, Russia
 Church of the Exaltation of the Holy Cross, Bratislava, Slovakia
 Church of the Exaltation of Holy Cross, Kopychyntsi, Ukraine
 Church of the Exaltation of the Holy Cross, Leśno, Poland
 Church of the Exaltation of the Holy Cross, Prostějov, Czech Republic